Farkhan may refer to:
 Farkhan-e Kohneh
 Farkhan-e Olya
 Farkhan-e Shahrah
 Farkhan-e Sofla